Below follows a list of episodes of the Brazilian series Um Menino Muito Maluquinho. The series was originally broadcast from March 19 to July 10, 2006 by TVE Brasil, with 26 episodes. From June 26, 2006, the new episodes aired from Monday to Friday at 8 p.m.

Episodes 
<onlyinclude>

See also 
 Um Menino Muito Maluquinho
 O Menino Maluquinho
 Ziraldo

References

Um Menino Muito Maluquinho